Roussin's red salt is the inorganic compound with the formula K2[Fe2S2(NO)4]. This metal nitrosyl was first described by Zacharie Roussin in 1858, making it one of the first synthetic iron-sulfur clusters.

Structure and bonding
Roussin's red salt anion is an edge-shared bitetrahedron, wherein a pair Fe(NO)2 units are bridged by a pair of sulfide ligands.  The Fe-NO bonds are linear indicating NO is acting as a three electron donor. The diamagnetic compound obeys the 18-electron rule. The dark red colour of the complex is attributed to a number of charge-transfer interactions between the iron core and nitrosyl ligands.

Synthesis
The French chemist Z. Roussin first prepared this salt while investigating reactions between nitroprusside ion ([Fe(CN)5NO]2−) and sulfur. The salt can be prepared by the reaction of sulfide salts with iron nitrosyl halides:
Fe2I2(NO)4 + 2Li2S → Li2Fe2S2(NO)4 + 2LiI

To obtain the "esters", the salt is alkylated:
Li2Fe2S2(NO)4  +  2 RX   →   Fe2(SR)2(NO)4 + 2 LiX

Esters can also be easily be prepared from the reaction of Fe2I2(NO)4 with the thiol.

Occurrence and potential applications
It is found in nature as its "esters" with the formula Fe2(SR)2(NO)4, where "R" is any alkyl group. In addition Roussin's red salt is discussed in the fields of microbiology and food science due to its mutagenic properties.

The ester derivative are being investigated as nitric oxide donors in biology and medicine, due to the relatively low toxicity and good stability of Roussin's red salt.Photodissociation of the compound induces the release of NO, thereby sensitizing target cells to exposure to radiation.

See also
 Roussin's black salt

References

Iron complexes
Sulfur compounds
Nitrosyl complexes